Krasucki (feminine: Krasucka; plural: Krasuccy) is a Polish surname. Notable people with the surname include:

 Franciela Krasucki (born 1988), Brazilian sprinter
 Henri Krasucki (1924–2003), French trade-unionist

See also
 

Polish-language surnames